is a Japanese voice actress associated with Arts Vision. She is the official Japanese dubbing voice for Velma Dinkley in the Scooby-Doo franchise and is known for voicing Etna in the Disgaea video game franchise. as well as Welch Vineyard in Star Ocean video games.

Filmography

Anime

Film

Video games

Unknown date
 Etna in Disgaea 2: Cursed Memories,  Cross Edge, Phantom Brave  
 Welch Vineyard in Star Ocean 
 Pokémon Trainer in Super Smash Bros. Brawl
 Haruka in Ape Escape: Pumped & Primed and Ape Escape Million Monkeys
 Shunpei Serizawa in The Saint of Braves Baan Gaan (Brave Saga)
 Rachel in Trapt
 Velma Dinkley in Lego Dimensions

Other voice recordings

Dubbing

References

External links
  
 Tomoe Hanba at Ryu's Seiyuu Infos
 

1972 births
Living people
Voice actresses from Tokyo
Japanese video game actresses
Japanese voice actresses
20th-century Japanese actresses
21st-century Japanese actresses
Arts Vision voice actors